"Women Do Know How to Carry On" is a song co-written and recorded by American country music artist Waylon Jennings.  It was released in June 1982 as the third single from the album Black on Black.  The song reached number 4 on the Billboard Hot Country Singles & Tracks chart.  The song was written by Jennings and Bobby Emmons.

Chart performance

References

1982 singles
1982 songs
Waylon Jennings songs
Songs written by Waylon Jennings
Song recordings produced by Chips Moman
RCA Records singles
Songs written by Bobby Emmons